Sara Benz (born 25 August 1992 in Zürich, Switzerland) is a Swiss ice hockey forward.

International career
Benz was selected for the Switzerland national women's ice hockey team in the 2010 Winter Olympics. She played in all five games, scoring a goal.

Benz has also appeared for Switzerland at four IIHF Women's World Championships. Her first appearance came in 2009. She was a member of the bronze medal-winning team at the 2012 championships.

Benz made three appearances for the Switzerland women's national under-18 ice hockey team, at two levels of the IIHF World Women's U18 Championships. Her first came in 2008.

Personal life
Her twin sister Laura Benz is also a hockey player.

Career statistics

International career

See also
List of Olympic medalist families

References

External links
Eurohockey.com Profile
Sports-Reference Profile

1992 births
Living people
Ice hockey players at the 2010 Winter Olympics
Ice hockey players at the 2014 Winter Olympics
Ice hockey players at the 2018 Winter Olympics
Medalists at the 2014 Winter Olympics
Olympic bronze medalists for Switzerland
Olympic ice hockey players of Switzerland
Olympic medalists in ice hockey
Ice hockey people from Zürich
Swiss women's ice hockey forwards
Twin sportspeople
Swiss twins
21st-century Swiss women